The Missouri Theatre, is a concert and entertainment venue in downtown Columbia, Missouri, occupying most of a city block between 9th street between Locust and Elm Streets. It was designed after the Opéra Garnier by the Boller Brothers, built in 1928, and is on the National Register of Historic Places.  It is Columbia's only surviving pre-Depression movie palace and vaudeville stage.  In 2011, the University of Missouri began a three-year lease of the facility. The Missouri Theatre is the resident home of the Missouri Symphony Orchestra, and is also frequently used by University of Missouri and civic groups. As of July 1, 2014, The University of Missouri took over ownership of the Missouri Theatre. It is one of the main performance venues for the University of Missouri School of Music.

History
The theater opened on October 5, 1928.  It was built at a cost of over 400,000 dollars which is equivalent to over 4.5 million dollars today. Advertisements in the Columbia Daily Tribune proclaimed the "Formal Opening of your new Missouri Theatre—Friday Evening… A $400,000 Showhouse of Unrivaled Beauty and Extravagant Setting in Central Missouri. The Magnificent Splendor of This Palace of Amusement Will Dazzle and Thrill You."  Telegrams were received from The United Artist in Hollywood, as well as from actors such as Charlie Chaplin and Gloria Swanson, congratulating the managers of the theater. On opening night the performers included The Missouri Rockettes (later to become the Radio City Rockettes) and Jack Keith and his Missouri Orchestra.  It was rumored that Bob Hope also made an appearance.  The Theatre operated much in this fashion as well as a movie palace until 1953.

Because of its size and extravagance the Missouri Theatre was difficult to maintain and was leased to Commonwealth Theaters, Inc. in 1953 who operated it as a single-screen movie theater until 1983. In 1979 the building was listed on the National Register of Historic Places.  The advent of the multiscreen cinemas in Columbia lead to the eventually purchase of the theatre by the Missouri Symphony Society on January 7, 1988.

In 2002, the Missouri Symphony Society began plans to transform the Missouri Theatre into the Missouri Theatre Center for the Arts (MTCA). The Missouri Symphony Society experienced record-breaking success in 2005 with the Hot Summer Nights Music Festival as more than 11,200 music lovers attended concerts featuring Maestro Kirk Trevor, the Missouri Symphony Orchestra, and world-renowned guest artists throughout its eight-week summer season.

On July 28, 2007, the restoration of the Missouri Theatre began after the conclusion of the Hot Summer Nights Music Festival. The following summer, the fully restored Missouri Theatre Center for the Arts re-opened with Tony Bennett and the Hot Summer Nights Music Festival. The renovations included a new second floor with administrative offices and a 2,500 sq. ft. rooftop patio.

In 2011 Missouri Theatre became home to the University Concert Series, and acts as a recital and performance venue for many University of Missouri School of Music performance groups. The Box Office is operated by Event Production Services a department of Operation Auxiliary and Services in the division of Campus Operations at the University of Missouri.

Architecture

The interior of the building is ornate baroque and rococo style of the Louis XIV and XV periods. It was designed after the Paris Opera House by the Boller Brothers Architects of Kansas City, Missouri. Much original detail still exist, including Belgian marble wainscoting, plaster reliefs, stained glass and, one of the most notable features, an 1800-pound Italian auditorium chandelier featuring crystal prisms and etched panels.  At one time, the deep red carpet in the grand lobby had the Great Seal of Missouri  and the letter M woven into it.

Missouri Symphony Orchestra
Missouri Theatre is the home of mid-Missouri's only professional resident symphony orchestra, the Missouri Symphony Orchestra (MSO). Established by the Missouri Symphony Society in 1976, the MSO is composed of musicians from throughout the United States and around the world.

Through its annual eight-week season, the Hot Summer Nights Music Festival in June and July, and tours throughout the state and beyond, the Missouri Symphony Orchestra has been heralded by the Kansas City Star as an ensemble that performs with "energy and elan, as well as secure technique." Since 2001, the MSO has been directed by Maestro Kirk Trevor.

Arts Education
In addition to the Missouri Symphony Society's artistic programming, the Missouri Theatre hosts multiple arts education programs and organizations, including the:

 MOSS Youth Orchestra
 MOSS Junior Strings
 MOSS Children's Choir
 University Concert Series
 University of Missouri School of Music
 Plowman Chamber Music Competition
 True/False Film Festival

References

External links

https://concertseries.missouri.edu/

Sources

Buildings and structures in Columbia, Missouri
University of Missouri
University of Missouri School of Music
Theatres in Columbia, Missouri
Music venues in Columbia, Missouri
Cinemas and movie theaters in Missouri
Performing arts centers in Missouri
Boller Brothers buildings
Tourist attractions in Columbia, Missouri
Theatres on the National Register of Historic Places in Missouri
Theatres completed in 1928
National Register of Historic Places in Columbia, Missouri
National Register of Historic Places in Boone County, Missouri
Public venues with a theatre organ
Landmarks in Columbia, Missouri